The phylogenetic classification of invertebrates (extinct and extant) remains a work-in-progress. The taxonomy of commonly fossilized invertebrates combines both traditional (old) and modern (21st-century) paleozoological terminology.

The paleobiologic systematics that follow are not intended to be comprehensive, rather encompass invertebrates that (a) are popularly collected as fossils and/or (b) extinct. As a result, some groups of invertebrates are not listed.

If an invertebrate animal is mentioned below using its common (vernacular) name, it is an extant (living) taxon, but if it is cited by its scientific genus, then it is typically an extinct invertebrate known only from the fossil record.

Invertebrate clades that are important fossils (e.g. ostracods, frequently used as index fossils), and/or clades that are very abundant as fossils (e.g. crinoids, easily found in crinoidal limestone), are highlighted with a bracketed exclamation mark [ ! ].

Invertebrate groups that contain a large proportion of extinct species are followed by a dashed notation [ – ]. Invertebrate clades which are now completely extinct are designated with a bracketed dagger [ † ]:

Domain of Eukaryota/Eukarya

Eukaryotes; eukaryotes are cellular organisms bearing a central, organized nucleus with DNA.

most of the species which have been documented by biologists and paleontologists, extinct or extant, are eukaryotic. 
includes: a wide variety of single-celled protists; all algae; most plankton; most molds; the green plants; all animal-related kingdoms.
does not include the primal, sub-nuclear, prokaryotic domains of Archaea and Bacteria – nor the enigmatic domain of Viruses.

Sub-domain of Opisthokonta:
Opisthokonts; the animal-related kingdoms. Include: proto-spongal choanoflagellates; proto-fungal microsporidians; true fungi; true animals.

most life forms documented, extinct or extant.
excludes: many molds; all one-celled protists (protoctists); all algae; all green plants.

Kingdom of Animalia / Metazoa - All Invertebrates and Vertebrates
Metazoans; multicellular "true" animals (multicellular creatures that capture and ingest their organic food).

comprises most living and deceased species which have ever been recorded, extinct or extant.
excludes all unicellular and fungal opisthokonts.

Sub-kingdom of Parazoa
Parazoans; typically sessile, basal non-eumetazoans. They are the most-primitive animals, comprising simple, colonial, attached, bottom-dwelling marine invertebrates.

Phylum Archaeocyatha/Archeocyatha/Archaeocyathida/Archeocyathida/Pleospongia [†]
Cone-shaped archaeocyathids/archeocyathids; cup-shaped archaeocyathans/archeocyathans; reef-building pleosponges;calcareous "ancient-cups".

Includes fossil genera such Archaeocyathus, Cambrocyathus, Atikonia,
Tumuliolynthus, Kotuyicyathus, Metaldetes, Ajacicyathus and Paranacyathus.

Archaeocyatha is sometimes classified as a class of Porifera below.

Phylum Porifera/Nuda/Spongia:

Quintessential true sponges; marine, colonial, pore-bearing animals; organized collar-flagellates; poriferans - today mostly siliceous – half of all documented species of Porifera are fossils and extinct. 

Porifera may eventually be broken up into separate phyla:
Sub-phylum Calcarea/Calcispongiae (primitive calcareous poriferans such as yellow lemon sponge, sphinctozoans, pharetronids, Scypha, Leucetta, Gravestockia, Grantia, Astraeospongium, Clathrina, Lelapia, Rhaphidonema, and Girtyocoelia).
Class Calcinea
Class Calcaronea
Class Stromatoporoidea/Stromatoporata/Stromatoporida/Spongliomorphida [†] (lime-layered stromatoporoids/reef-building stromatoporates/button-shaped stromatoporids/disc-shaped spongliomorphids; e.g., Stromatopora, Aulacera, Stromatactis, Actinostroma, Discophyllum, Parallelopora and Amphipora)
Class Heteractinida [†] (Paleozoic calcitic heteractinids such as Eiffelia)
Sub-phylum Silicea / Silicospongia (siliceous poriferans):
Class Demospongea/Demospongiae (most living sponges hardened by opaline silica or spongin; for instance, horny sponge, bath sponge, stove-pipe sponge, yellow boring sponge, carnivorous sponge, bristle sponge, chaetids, lithistids, Astroclera, Ceractinomorpha, Clionoides, Hindia, Ventriculites, Laosoiadia, Clionolithes, Tetractinella, and Astylospongia)
Class Hexactinellida/Hyalospongiae/Sclerospongiae (siliceous, deep-sea glass sponges, e.g. glassy-latticed Venus flower basket, bird's nest sponge, cloud sponge, Hexactinella, Hydroceras, Dictyonina, Brachiospongia, Titusvillea, and Rhizopoterion)

Sub-kingdom of Eumetazoa
Eumetazoans; true metazoans (typically mobile, multicellular animals).

Eumetazoa contains most of the living and deceased species of recorded life, including most invertebrates (extinct and extant), as well as all vertebrate animals.

Super-phylum of Radiata
Radiates; non-bilaterian eumetazoans.

Phylum Cnidaria/Coelenterata

Cnidarians/coelenterates:

Class Hydrozoa (hydra or hydroid group):
Subclass Stromatoporoidea [†] (lime-layered stromatoporoids)
Subclass Conulata [†] (four-sided, pyramidal conularians)
Class Anthozoa (corals / polyps):
Subclass Octocorallia / Alcyonaria (soft corals and sea pens)
Subclass Zoantharia [!] (sea anemones and most extant corals)
Order Rugosa / Tetracoralla [†] [!] (wrinkled, horn-shaped tetracorals such as Petoskey coral, Caninia and Heliophyllum)
Order Tabulata / Schizocoralla [†] [!] (tabulate corals, for instance, Favosites and Aulopora)
Order Scleractinia / Hexacoralla [!] (stony corals such as brain coral, Favia, Meandrina, and most living corals)

Super-phylum of Lophotrochozoa / Protostomia # 1
Lophotrochozoan bilaterians, such as flatworms, ribbon worms, lophophorates, and molluscs.

Phylum Bryozoa/Ectoprocta/Polyzoa

Bryozoans – half of all documented species of Bryozoa are fossils and extinct. 
Class Stenolaemata / Gymnolaemata [!] (mostly marine, calcareous bryozoans):
Order Cheilostomata [!] (living, rimmed-mouthed moss animals)
Order Cyclostomatida (uncontracted, round-mouthed bryozoans including fossil Stomatopora)
Order Cystoporata [†] (extinct, minor group of moss animals)
Order Trepostomata [†] [!] (changed-mouthed bryozoans such as extinct Constellaria and Monticulipora)
Order Cryptostomata [†] [!] (round hidden-mouthed bryozoans such as Archimedes, Fenestrellina and Rhombopora)
Order Ctenostomata [†] (uncommon, comb-mouthed bryozoans)
Order Phylactolaemata (living, fresh-water bryozoans)

Phylum Brachiopoda

Lampshells, brachiopods or "brachs," (not to be confused with the hard-shelled marine mollusks below) – 99% of all documented species of Brachiopoda are now extinct.

Subphylum Linguliformea (inarticulate atremates, such as "living fossil" Lingula) – but mostly extinct.
Subphylum Craniiformea (inarticulate neotremates, such as extant Crania) – but mostly extinct.
Subphylum Rhynchonelliformea [!] (articulate brachiopods with hinged valves; includes most extinct and living brachs).
Class Rhynchonellata [!]
Order Orthida [†] [!] (orthid brachs such as fossil Orthis)
Order Pentamerida [†] (pentamerid brachs such as Conchidium)
Order Rhynchonellida [!] (rhynchonellid brachs such as fossils Rhynchotrema and Rhynchonella)
Order Spiriferida [†] [!] (spiriferid brachs)
Suborder Spiriferinida [†] [!] (spiriferid brachs such as Spirifer and Eospirifer)
Suborder Atrypida [†] [!] (atrypid brachs such as Atrypa)
Order Terebratulida [!] (most living brachiopods; includes fossil Dielasma)
Class Strophomenata [†] [!] (so-called petrified butterflies)
Order Strophomenida [†] [!] (strophomenid brachs)
Order Productida [†] [!] (spiny or productid brachs)
Suborder Chonetidina [†] [!]
Suborder Productidina [†] [!]

Phylum Annelida
Segmented worms such as earthworms and leeches.

Class Polychaeta (marine annelids / polychaetes)
Order Scolecodonta [!] (mostly chitinous jaws of scolecodonts)

Phylum Mollusca

Molluscs or mollusks, not to be confused with the hard-shelled marine brachiopods above.

Class Monoplacophora (extinct, except for "living fossil" Neopilina)
Class Bivalvia / Pelecypoda (bivalves / pelecypods) – half of all documented species of Bivalvia are fossils and extinct 
Subclass Lamellibranchia [!] (clams, oysters, mussels and scallops)
Class Gastropoda (gastropods / snail group)
Subclass Prosobranchia (marine snails and conches)
Subclass Opisthobranchia (sea slugs)
Subclass Pulmonata (land snails)
Class Cephalopoda (cephalopods) – 97 percent of all documented species of Cephalopoda are now extinct
Subclass Nautiloidea (mostly extinct, but includes "living fossil" Nautilus)
Order Orthocerida [†] [!] (long, straight-shelled nautiloids)
Subclass Ammonoidea [†] [!] (generally coiled-shelled ammonoids)
Agoniatitic (agoniatites) [†]
Goniatitic (goniatites) [†] [!] (ammonoids with simple sutures)
Ceratitic (ceratites) [†]
Ammonitic [†] [!] (the true ammonites, bearing complex sutures)
Subclass Coleoidea (includes the living squid, cuttlefish, and octopus)
Order Belemnoidea [†] (extinct orthoconic belemnoids)

Super-phylum of Ecdysozoa/Protostomia # 2
Ecdysozoans, such as nematodes, horsehair worms, and molting bilaterians/panarthropods

Phylum Tardigrada
Panarthropodic water bears.

Phylum Onychophora
Panarthropodic velvet worms, including proto-arthropodic fossils of Arthropleura and Aysheaia.

Phylum Arthropoda

Arthropods; jointed legged creatures with an exoskeleton.

Subphylum Crustacea (crustaceans)
Class Ostracoda (ostracods)
Class Malacostraca (true crabs, lobster and most shrimp)
Class Branchiopoda (brine shrimp)
Order Notostraca
Class Cirripedia (barnacles)
Class Arachnoidea
Subphylum Trilobitomorpha [†] (extinct trilobite group)
Class Trilobita [†] (the armored trilobites)
Subphylum Hexapoda
Class Insecta (insects, best preserved in amber)
Subphylum Chelicerata
Class Arachnida (spiders, best preserved in amber)
Class Xiphosura ("living fossil" horseshoe crabs)
Subphylum Myriapoda
Class Diplopoda
Class Chilopoda

Super-phylum of Deuterostomia / Enterocoelomata
Second-mouthed bilaterians called deuterostomians, such as chordates and echinoderms.

Phylum Echinodermata

Echinoderms – 72% of all documented species of Echinodermata are fossils and extinct. 

Subphylum Crinozoa (sessile echinoderms) – 91 percent of all documented species of Crinozoa are now extinct
Class Crinoidea (crinoids / sea lilies) – See Crinozoa above
Subphylum Blastozoa [†] (extinct blastoids)
Class Diploporita
Class Rhombifera
Subphylum Echinozoa (mobile echinoderms) – 89 percent of all documented species of Echinozoa are now extinct
Class Echinoidea (echinoids or sea urchins) – See Echinozoa above
Order Clypeasteroida
Order Camarodonta
Subphylum Asterozoa
Class Asteroidea (sea stars / starfish)
Class Ophiuroidea

Phylum Hemichordata

Hemichordates such as extant acorn worms – Less than half of the documented species of Hemichordata are fossils and extinct.

Class Graptoloidea [†] (extinct graptolites)
Order Dendroidea [†]
Order Graptoloidea [†]
Suborder Didymograptina [†]
Suborder Diplograptina [†]
Suborder Monograptina [†]

Phylum Chordata
Both invertebrate and vertebrate chordates; animals possessing a notochord.

Invertebrate subphyla
Subphylum Urochordata (invertebrate tunicate such as sea squirts)
Subphylum Cephalochordata (invertebrate lancelets)

Subphylum Vertebrata

Vertebrates such as hagfishes, lampreys, conodonts [†], ostracoderms [†], placoderms [†], sharks, ray-finned fishes, lobe-finned fishes, amphibians, reptiles, dinosaurs [†], birds and mammals.

See also
Invertebrate paleontology

References

Taxonomy
Fossils
Animal taxonomy